Irenaeus Frederic Baraga (June 29, 1797 – January 19, 1868) was a Slovenian Roman Catholic missionary to the United States and a grammarian by and author of Christian poetry and hymns in Native American languages. He became the first bishop of the Roman Catholic Diocese of Marquette, Michigan, originally sited at Sault Sainte Marie, which he led for 15 years.

His letters about his missionary work were published widely in Europe, inspiring the priests John Neumann and Francis Xavier Pierz to emigrate to the United States. In 2012, during the reign of Pope Benedict XVI, Baraga was declared "Venerable."

Early life
Frederic Baraga was born in the manor house at Mala Vas no. 16 near the Carniolan village of Dobrnič, in what was then Lower Carniola, a province of the Duchy of Carniola in the Habsburg monarchy. Today it is a part of the Municipality of Trebnje in Slovenia. Never using his first name, he was baptized Irenaeus Fridericus Paraga.

He was the fourth of five children born to Janez Baraga and Marija Katarina Jožefa née Jenčič. Upon her father's death, his mother inherited an estate at Mala Vas, plus a substantial fortune. His mother died in 1808, and his father in 1812. Frederic spent his boyhood in the house of Jurij Dolinar, a lay professor at the diocesan seminary at Ljubljana.

Baraga grew up during the Napoleonic Wars, when France had taken over the Slovene Lands from the Austrian Empire for a time. As a result, the official language of instruction in his schools changed several times during his childhood between Slovenian and German. By the time he was nine, he was fluent in French as well. In addition, Latin and Greek were required subjects for all students. Thus, by age 16, Frederic Baraga was multilingual—a skill that would serve him well in later life.

Priesthood
Baraga attended law school at the University of Vienna, where he graduated in 1821. Influenced by Clement Mary Hofbauer, Baraga then entered the seminary in Ljubljana. At age 26, he was ordained a Roman Catholic priest on September 21, 1823, in the St. Nicholas' Cathedral by Augustin Johann Joseph Gruber, the Bishop of Ljubljana. As a young priest, he was assigned as an assistant first at St. Martin's near Kranj and later at Metlika in lower Carniola. Father Baraga was a staunch opponent of Jansenism. During this time, he wrote a spiritual book in Slovene entitled  (Spiritual Sustenance).

In 1830 Baraga answered the request of Bishop Edward Fenwick of Cincinnati for priests to aid in ministering to his growing flock, which included a large mission territory. He left his homeland on October 29, 1830, and arrived in New York on December 31. He arrived in Cincinnati, Ohio, on January 18, 1831. During the winter and spring, he worked among the German immigrants in the area. At the same time, he studied the Ottawa language, a branch of the Algonquian languages. In May 1831 was sent to the Ottawa Indian mission at L'Arbre Croche (present-day Cross Village, Michigan) to finish his mastery of the language.

In 1837, he published , the first book written in the Ottawa language, which included a Catholic catechism and prayer book. After a brief stay at a mission in present-day Grand Rapids, Michigan, in 1835, Baraga moved north to minister to the Ojibway (Chippewa) Indians at La Pointe, Wisconsin, at a former Jesuit mission on Lake Superior.

In 1843 Baraga founded a mission at L'Anse, Michigan. During this time, he earned the nickname "the Snowshoe Priest" because he would travel hundreds of miles each year on snowshoes during the harsh winters. He worked to protect the Indians from being forced to relocate, as well as publishing a dictionary and grammar of the Ojibway language. Although these works have important historical value, they are not recommended as basic resources for the language today.

With the collaboration of many native speakers, Fr. Baraga also composed around 100 Catholic hymns in the Ojibwe language, which were published in a hymnal and still continue to be used by the Ojibwe people in Roman Catholic worship in both Canada and the United States.

Through the texts Baraga published in his missionary years, the Slovenes learned about aspects of Native American culture and the United States.

Bishop
Baraga was elevated to bishop by Pope Pius IX and consecrated November 1, 1853, in Cincinnati at Saint Peter in Chains Cathedral by Archbishop John Purcell. He was the first bishop of the Roman Catholic Diocese of Sault Sainte Marie, Michigan, now the Diocese of Marquette.

On July 27, 1852, he began to keep a diary, written in several languages (primarily German, but with English, French, Slovene, Chippewa, Latin, and Italian interspersed), preserving accounts of his missionary travels and his relationship with his sister Amalia. During this time, the area experienced a population explosion, as European immigrants were attracted to work in the copper and iron mines developed near Houghton, Ontonagon, and Marquette. This presented a challenge because he had few priests and attended to immigrant miners and the Native Americans. Increased development and population encouraged the improvement of transportation on Lake Superior.

The only way to travel in winter was on snowshoes, which Baraga continued to do into his sixties. He was particularly challenged by the vast diversity of peoples in the region, including the native inhabitants, ethnic French-Canadian settlers, and the new German and Irish immigrant miners. Difficulties in recruiting staff arose because of many languages; while Baraga spoke eight languages fluently, he had trouble recruiting priests who could do the same.

Baraga traveled twice to Europe to raise money for his diocese. He was presented a jeweled cross and episcopal ring by the Emperor Franz Joseph I of Austria. The bishop later sold these for his missions.

Baraga wrote numerous letters to the Society for the Propagation of the Faith describing his missionary activities. The Society published them widely as examples of its missions in North America, and they were instrumental in inspiring the priests John Neumann and Francis Xavier Pierz to come to the United States to work. In time, Baraga became renowned throughout Europe for his work. In his last ten years, his health gradually declined; he became intermittently deaf and suffered a series of strokes. In 1865 Baraga wrote to Pope Pius IX in support of the canonization of his former confessor, Clement Hofbauer. He died January 19, 1868, in Marquette, Michigan. He is buried there in the crypt beneath Cathedral of Saint Peter.

Legacy and veneration

Baraga was declared venerable by Pope Benedict XVI on May 10, 2012. His cause was opened in 1952 by Thomas Lawrence Noa, the diocese's eighth bishop, and the formal canonization process began in 1973. The diocese planned to relocate his remains to a more accessible new chapel for veneration in the upper portion of the cathedral. At the time of his veneration, the Vatican was investigating a possible miracle for beatification.

The village of Baraga, Baraga Township, Baraga County, and Baraga State Park (all in Michigan) were named for him.
The Diocese of Ljubljana began construction of the Baraga Seminary in Ljubljana in 1936. However, the building was unfinished on the outbreak of World War II in 1941.
A street in Milwaukee is named for Baraga.
An Ontario Provincial Plaque is located on the grounds of Our Lady of Sorrows Roman Catholic Church (Goulais Bay, Ontario), which was built by Baraga
A memorial sculpture of him by Jack E. Anderson is located in L'Anse, Michigan.
Bishop Baraga Catholic School was named for him in Iron Mountain, Michigan.
Bishop Baraga Catholic School was named for him in Cheboygan, Michigan.
In 1846, Baraga erected a wooden cross in Schroeder, Minnesota, at the mouth of the Cross River, in thanks for his safe landing during a storm on Lake Superior. It has been replaced with a granite cross.
At the Shrine of Our Lady of Guadalupe in La Crosse, Wisconsin, a shrine in the church has been dedicated in his honor.
A bronze statue of Baraga in Grand Rapids honors his efforts in 1833 to establish the first Catholic mission in that location.
Baraga is the namesake of a network of six Catholic radio stations serving northern Michigan and is based at originating station WTCK licensed to Charlevoix with its main studio located near the Cross in the Woods Catholic Shrine in Indian River.
The U.S. Postal Service issued a 13-cent commemorative postcard honoring Baraga in 1984.

References

Further reading

 Verwyst, P. Chrysostomus. Life and Labors of Rt. Rev. Frederic Baraga, First Bishop of Marquette Mich. Milwaukee: Wiltzius, 1900.

External links

Bishop Baraga's pastoral letter
Bishop Baraga's Pastoral Letter to the Indians
Biography at the Dictionary of Canadian Biography Online
St. Peter Cathedral and Bishop Baraga 
Fr. Baraga's 1853 Ojibwe Dictionary
Father Baraga's cross 
 
 

1797 births
1868 deaths
American Roman Catholic hymnwriters
People from the Municipality of Trebnje
University of Vienna alumni
Slovenian Roman Catholic bishops
People from Marquette, Michigan
19th-century Roman Catholic bishops in the United States
Slovenian Roman Catholic missionaries
Grammarians from Carniola
Austrian Empire emigrants to the United States
Upper Peninsula of Michigan
Roman Catholic bishops of Marquette
19th-century venerated Christians
Burials at St. Peter Cathedral (Marquette, Michigan)
Slovenian venerated Catholics
Venerated Catholics by Pope Benedict XVI
Roman Catholic missionaries in the United States
Linguists of Algic languages
American venerated Catholics
Missionary linguists
Native American Christianity
Native American history of Michigan